Tanggu District was a district in the Tianjin municipality, now part of the Binhai New Area. It is on the Hai River where it enters the Bohai Sea, and is a port for Tianjin, which is about  upriver. The Tianjin Economic-Technological Development Area is within the city limits and oversees the construction of a bridge.

The Tanggu Truce was signed in Tanggu.

Administrative divisions
Subdistricts
Xincun
Jiefanglu
Sanhuailu
Xingang
Hangzhoudao
Xinhe
Xiangyang
Dagu
Beitang
Hujiayuan
Town:
Xincheng

Climate

See also
Port of Tianjin

Notes

External links
Official website of Tanggu District Government

Districts of Tianjin
1927 establishments in China
2009 disestablishments in China

eo:Tanggu